The Afrikaanse Woordelys en Spelreëls (AWS) is a publication of the Suid-Afrikaanse Akademie vir Wetenskap en Kuns and comprises three main sections: spelling rules, a list of words, and a list of abbreviations for Afrikaans. The first edition appeared in 1917, and regular revisions have been undertaken since then. The main aim of the publication is to provide guidance in respect of Afrikaans spelling.

Full details of this publication are available in Afrikaans in the article, "Afrikaanse Woordelys en Spelreëls".

Notes and references

Afrikaans-language mass media
1917 establishments in South Africa
Spelling dictionaries